FMI Air was a scheduled airline based in Yangon, Myanmar.

History
FMI Air Charter was established on 9 September 2012 operating charter flights from Yangon Airport to Nay Pyi Taw. The airline was renamed in 2015 and launched services as FMI Air in May 2015. FMI Air operated daily flights (17 x week ) between the commercial hub, Yangon International Airport and Naypyidaw International Airport. In addition to scheduled flights FMI Air offered Charter flight services to over 20 airports within Myanmar.

The airline ceased operations in August 2018 after struggling to find a business partner.

Services 
FMI Air was a schedule service airline offering a Premium Service to both the growing corporate and leisure sectors which include complimentary access to lounges and concierge services. FMI Air has its own APP ( FMI AIR ) to assist international travellers. FMI Air provided scheduled air services to Myanmar's Capital Nay Pyi Taw,  Bagan, Heho, Mandalay, Sittwe, Thandwe, Kawthaung, Myitkyina. FMI Air was Myanmar's #3 airline in terms of fleet size with plans to grow its domestic network in 2017/18 as well operate internationally. FMI Air has recently been rated as Myanmar's Preferred choice LEISURE AIRLINE  because of its network customer experience.

Destinations 
FMI Air operated schedule flights from YANGON to the below destinations.

 Nay Pyi Taw International Airport
 Sittwe Airport
 Mandalay International Airport  
 Heho Airport which services Inle Lake  
 Nyaung U Airport which service Bagan 
 Thandwe Airport which serves Ngpali Beach
 Kawthaung Airport
 Dawei Airport
 Myeik Airport

Fleet

Current fleet
The FMI Air fleet consisted of the following aircraft (as of August 2018):

Former fleet
FMI Air Charter used the following aircraft (as of October 2015):
ATR 42
ATR 72
Beechcraft 1900D

See also
List of defunct airlines of Myanmar

References

Defunct airlines of Myanmar
Airlines established in 2012
Airlines disestablished in 2018
Companies based in Yangon